Montherlant may refer to:

 Henry de Montherlant, (1895 – 1972), a French writer and dramatist
 Montherlant, Oise, a commune in France